Ertil may refer to:
Ertil Urban Settlement, an administrative division and a municipal formation which the town of Ertil and eight rural localities in Ertilsky District of Voronezh Oblast, Russia are incorporated as
Ertil (inhabited locality), several inhabited localities in Russia
Ertil (river), a river in Russia
Ertil Mancaku, Albanian basketball player for PBC Tirana